The 2022 Brunei FA Cup was the 13th edition of the Brunei FA Cup and was the sole club competition organised by the Football Association of Brunei Darussalam for the year 2022. It began on August 6 and will be played until 4 December.

The winner of the FA Cup will become the nation's representative for the 2023–24 AFC Cup.

DPMM FC became the winners of the competition by beating Kasuka FC 2–1 in the final at Track & Field Sports Complex on 4 December. This is DPMM's second FA Cup triumph after last winning it in 2004.

Competition format 

32 teams were divided into groups of four, making eight groups in total. Teams will only play one round of matches, and the top two teams in the group table will advance to the knockout stage. The knockout matches will be contested in a home-and-away format up until the final match.

List of participating teams 

from Brunei Super League

 BAKES FC
 BSRC FC
 DPMM FC
 IKLS-MB5 FC
 Indera SC
 Jerudong FC
 Kasuka FC
 KB FC
 Kota Ranger FC
 MS ABDB
 MS PPDB
 Panchor Murai FC
 Rimba Star FC
 Setia Perdana FC
 Wijaya FC

from District Leagues

 Admirul Red Star FC
 AKSE Bersatu
 Almerez FA
 Azmainshah FC
 Bang Dalam FC
 Dagang FT
 Hawa FC
 HR FT
 Lun Bawang FC
 Miisa United FC
 MSN United FC
 Nelayan FT
 Perka United FC
 Seri Wira FC
 TDAFA U-20
 Tutong Hotspurs
 Wondrous FT

Group stage

Group A

Group B

Group C

Group D

Group E

Group F

Group G

Group H

Knockout stage

Round of 16
Matches to be played on 1-2 October and 15-16 October.

|}

First leg

Second leg

Quarter-final
The draw for the quarter-final allocation was held on 17 October. Matches are to be played on 22-23 October and 12-15 November.

|}

First leg

Second leg

Semi-final

|}

First leg

Second leg

Final

Bracket

Awards

Top scorers 
 ''Note: Goals for this competition do not count towards goalscoring records of the Brunei Super League, nor individual domestic league goal tallies

References

Brunei